Dominiković is a surname, derived from the given name Dominic. Notable people with the surname include:

Danielle Dominikovic (born 1987), Australian tennis player
Davor Dominiković (born 1978), Croatian handball player
Evie Dominikovic (born 1980), Australian tennis player

Croatian surnames
Patronymic surnames
Surnames from given names